The M82 is a short metropolitan route in Greater Johannesburg, South Africa It connects various suburbs in Alberton.

Route 
The M81 begins as a T-junction with the Vereeniging Road (M61) near Alrode South and Katlehong. The route heads north-west through Albertsdal as Hennie Alberts Street. It crosses the R26 Sybrand van Niekerk Freeway as a flyover and turns northwards passing through Brackendowns and Brakenhurst. At the northern end of Brakenhurst it intersects and crosses Swartkoppies Road (R554). Continuing north, it soon ends in Meyersdal when it intersects Bellairs Drive and Nelson Mandela Avenue (M95).

References 

Streets and roads of Johannesburg
Metropolitan routes in Johannesburg